SIRS may refer to:
 Systemic inflammatory response syndrome 
 Scout International Relief Service

See also 
 Sirs, a surname (including a list of people with the surname)
 Not to be confused with SARS, a coronavirus disease, of which there are two related types, SARS, which is currently not a threat, and COVID-19.